Diplura, "two-pronged bristletails", is an order of hexapods closely related to insects

Diplura may also refer to:

Diplura (spider), a genus of mygalomorph spiders
Diplura (alga), a genus of brown algae in the order Ishigeales

See also
Dipleura, a genus of trilobite

Genus disambiguation pages